The Roman Catholic Diocese of Lincoln is a Catholic diocese in Nebraska, United States, and comprises the majority of the eastern and central portions of the state south of the Platte River. It is a suffragan see to the archdiocese of Omaha.  The episcopal see is in Lincoln, Nebraska.  Bishop James D. Conley is the current ordinary of the Diocese. The Cathedral of the Risen Christ is the cathedral parish of the diocese.

History

The diocese was established on August 2, 1887, by Pope Leo XIII from the territory taken from the Diocese of Omaha.

In 1996, Bishop Fabian Bruskewitz issued a statement forbidding Catholics in the diocese to join a number of organizations, including the Society of St. Pius X, Call to Action, Planned Parenthood, Catholics for a Free Choice, the Hemlock Society, and various Masonic groups, under pain of excommunication.

In 2006, the Diocese rejected the proposed undertaking of an audit by the National Review Board of the United States Conference of Catholic Bishops - which would have examined whether the Diocese had effectively implemented national guidelines on sex-abuse programs In June 2014, the chairman of the U.S. Conference of Catholic Bishops' National Review Board for the protection of children reported that the Lincoln diocese was the only one in the United States that had yet to comply with the USCCB's charter requiring every diocese to submit its procedures for the protection of children to the Review Board for an audit. According to a 2015 statement by Conley, the Lincoln Diocese has complied with all church and civil laws on child-abuse reporting and child protection. He stated that the audit process had been improved and that the diocese would now therefore participate.

The Diocese of Lincoln was the only diocese in the United States that does not allow female altar servers, after the only other holdout ended its prohibition on females in 2006. It was joined by a church in the diocese of Phoenix in August 2011, when it announced that girls would no longer be allowed to serve at the altar.

The diocese of Lincoln was one of the last American Catholic dioceses not to have a permanent diaconate, although there were a few permanent deacons who served in Lincoln who came from other diocese. In 2016, Conley gave permission for lay married men to begin discerning the permanent diaconate in cooperation with the archdiocese of Omaha's diaconate program. On May 28, 2021, Matthew Hecker became the first permanent deacon to be ordained for the diocese.

Demographics and statistics
''Source:
Diocese patron: Immaculate Conception
Priests: 174
Deacons: 1 permanent; 4 transitional
Seminarians: 30
Religious priests: 10
Religious sisters: 141
Religious brothers: 8

Bishops
The bishops of the diocese and their years of service:

 Thomas Bonacum (1887-1911)
 John Henry Tihen (1911-1917), appointed Bishop of Denver
 Charles Joseph O'Reilly (1918-1923)
 Francis Beckman (1924-1930), appointed Archbishop of Dubuque
 Louis Benedict Kucera (1930-1957)
 James Vincent Casey (1957-1967), formerly auxiliary bishop, appointed Archbishop of Denver
 Glennon Patrick Flavin (1967-1992)
 Fabian Bruskewitz (1992-2012)
 James D. Conley (2012–present)

Priests who became bishops elsewhere
 Robert F. Vasa, appointed Bishop of Baker in 1999 and later Bishop of Santa Rosa in California
 Thomas Olmsted, appointed Coadjutor Bishop (in 1999) and later Bishop of Wichita and Bishop of Phoenix
 Michael Owen Jackels, appointed Bishop of Wichita in 2005 and later Archbishop of Dubuque
 John Folda, appointed Bishop of Fargo in 2013

High schools
Aquinas High School, David City
Sacred Heart High School, Falls City
St. Cecilia High School, Hastings
Lourdes Central Catholic High School, Nebraska City
Pius X High School, Lincoln
Bishop Neumann High School, Wahoo

See also

 Catholic Church by country
 Catholic Church in the United States
 Ecclesiastical Province of Omaha
 Global organisation of the Catholic Church
 List of Roman Catholic archdioceses (by country and continent)
 List of Roman Catholic dioceses (alphabetical) (including archdioceses)
 List of Roman Catholic dioceses (structured view) (including archdioceses)
 List of the Catholic dioceses of the United States

References

External links
 Diocesan website

 
Lincoln
Roman Catholic Ecclesiastical Province of Omaha
Religious organizations established in 1887
Lincoln
1887 establishments in Nebraska